Churachandpur is one of the 60 Vidhan Sabha constituencies in the Indian state of Manipur that makes up the Manipur Legislative Assembly.

Members of Legislative Assembly 
1962: Paoneikhai Suantak, Indian National Congress
1967 : Lalrokung Hmar
1968: Ngurdinglien Sanate
 1980: K. Vungzalian, Independent
 1984: J. F. Rothangliana, Kuki National Assembly
 1990: V. Hangkhanlian, MPP
 1995: V. Hangkhanlian, MPP
 2000: V. Hangkhanlian, Manipur State Congress Party
 2002: T. Phungzathang, Indian National Congress
 2007: T. Phungzathang, Indian National Congress
 2012: T. Phungzathang, Indian National Congress

Election results

2017

2012

See also
 List of constituencies of the Manipur Legislative Assembly
 Churachandpur district

References

External link
 

Assembly constituencies of Manipur
Churachandpur district